North East Frontier Technical University (NEFTU) was established under 2F of UGC Act 1956 through The North East Frontier Technical University Act, 2014, by the Government of Arunachal Pradesh Legislative, vide notification number LAW/LEGN-9/2014, in the Indian state of Arunachal Pradesh, in 2014.

The University is located in Aalo, West Siang district, Arunachal Pradesh, India.

The university offers undergraduate, postgraduate, and doctoral programs in various fields such as engineering, management, computer applications, education, and humanities. Some of the popular courses offered at NEFTU include B.Tech, MBA, MCA, B.Ed, and Ph.D. 

The university also has collaborations with several reputed international universities for student exchange programs and research collaborations.

References

External links
 NEFTU Official Website

Universities in Arunachal Pradesh
West Siang district
Educational institutions established in 2014
2014 establishments in Arunachal Pradesh